Lao Aviation Flight 703 was a scheduled domestic passenger flight from Vientiane to Xam Neua, Laos. On 19 October 2000, the Harbin Y-12 II crashed into a mountain  from the airport due to pilot error. At least eight passengers died, including citizens from Germany, Singapore, and South Africa, while seven passengers and two crew members survived but were injured.  The crash was the fourth fatal crash involving the airline in the previous ten years, and the second in four months.

The search for the crash site was made difficult by low cloud cover and dense smoke in the area.  One group of survivors walked from the crash site to a village nearby.

References 

2000 in Laos
Airliner accidents and incidents involving controlled flight into terrain
Aviation accidents and incidents in 2000
Aviation accidents and incidents in Laos
October 2000 events in Asia